The English Short Title Catalogue (ESTC) is a union short-title catalogue of works published between 1473 and 1800, in Britain and its former colonies, notably those in North America, and primarily in English, drawing on the collections of the British Library and other libraries in Britain and around the world. It is co-managed by the British Library and the Center for Bibliographical Studies and Research (CBSR) at the University of California, Riverside. The database is freely searchable.

History
The ESTC began life as the Eighteenth-Century Short Title Catalogue, with the same abbreviation, covering only 1701 to 1800. Earlier printed works had been catalogued in A. W. Pollard and G. R. Redgrave's Short Title Catalogue (1st edn 1926; 2nd edn, 1976–91) for the period 1473 to 1640; and Donald Goddard Wing's similarly titled bibliography (1945–51, with later supplements and addenda) for the period 1641 to 1700. These works were eventually incorporated into the database.

See also
 Books in the United Kingdom
 Books in the United States
 Incunabula Short Title Catalogue
 Universal Short Title Catalogue

References

Bibliography 
 Snyder, Henry L. and Michael S. Smith (eds.) The English Short-Title Catalogue: past, present, future. New York: AMS, 2003.

External links 
 English Short Title Catalogue (free access via the British Library)
 Alston, Robin. The Eighteenth Century Short Title Catalogue: a personal history to 1989.

British Library
Bibliography
Short title catalogues
Online databases
Early modern printing databases